Insectia is a Canadian nature documentary program that premiered on the Discovery Channel on February 4, 1999. The show's host, Georges Brossard, explains the life of insects by traveling around the world and introducing specimens in their natural habitat. Shot in 1998, it is the first Canadian documentary program to be filmed in high definition resolution. It aired on the now-defunct Discovery HD Theater in high definition after the channel's launch in 2002.

Episodes

Season 1

Season 2

Notes

External links 
 

Discovery Channel (Canada) original programming
Nature educational television series
Television series about insects